{{Infobox rugby biography
| name = Alan Tait
| image = 
| birth_name = Alan Victor Tait
| birth_date = 
| birth_place = Kelso, Scottish Borders, Scotland
| height = 
| weight = 
| school = 
| university = 
| relatives =
| rl_position = Full back / 
| rl_clubyears1 = 1988–92
| rl_clubyears2 = 1992–96
| rl_proclubs1 = Widnes
| rl_proclubs2 = Leeds
| rl_clubapps1 = 136
| rl_clubapps2 = 126
| rl_clubpoints1 = 225
| rl_clubpoints2 = 176
| rl_nationalyears1 = 1989-93
| rl_nationalyears2 = 1995-96
| rl_nationalteam1 = Great Britain
| rl_nationalteam2 = Scotland 
| rl_nationalapps1 = 10+4
| rl_nationalapps2 = 4
| rl_nationalpoints1 = 24
| rl_nationalpoints2 = 20
| ru_position = Centre
| amatyears1 =1987–88
| amatteam1 = Kelso
| ru_amupdate =
| ru_province = South of ScotlandReds Trial
| ru_provinceyears = -
| ru_provincecaps =
| ru_provincepoints =
| ru_provinceupdate= 
| years1 = 1996–98
| years2 = 1998–2000
| clubs1 = Newcastle Falcons
| clubs2 = Edinburgh
| apps1 = 19
| points1 = 10
| repyears1 = 1987–99
| repyears2 = 1997
| repteam1 = 
| repteam2 = British and Irish Lions
| repcaps1 = 27
| repcaps2 = 2
| reppoints1 = 81
| reppoints2 =5
| repupdate = 
| coachyears1 = 2009–122022-
| coachteams1 = Newcastle FalconsSouthern Knights (
}}

Alan Victor Tait (born 2 November 1964) is a former Scottish dual-code rugby footballer, and now coach. He is a defence coach at the Super 6 side Southern Knights. He was previously head coach at Newcastle Falcons and a former rugby union and professional rugby league footballer. He played outside centre for Scotland (RU), and the British and Irish Lions. He played club rugby union for Kelso, Edinburgh and the Newcastle Falcons; and club rugby league for Widnes and Leeds.

Tait changed codes twice in his life, once going from rugby union to rugby league, and then going the other way after union became professional during the mid-1990s.

Rugby Union
Unlike many other cross-code converts of the period, Tait had the benefit of growing up in Cumbria, where his father, Alan Senior, was playing for Workington Town. However, Tait played Union first and made his Test début for Scotland in the inaugural 1987 World Cup held in New Zealand where, he came on after seven minutes as a replacement in a 20–20 draw with France in Christchurch.

Tait played for the Reds Trial side in their match against Blues Trial on 3 January 1987.

Rugby League
The following year Tait switched codes to rugby league where he was to spend the next eight years playing club rugby for Widnes and Leeds, as well as representing Great Britain and Scotland.

During the 1989–90 season, Tait played for defending champions Widnes at fullback in their 1989 World Club Challenge victory against the visiting Canberra Raiders.
Tait won the Harry Sunderland Trophy in both 1989 and 1990.

Alan Tait played  in Widnes' 24–18 victory over Salford in the 1990 Lancashire Cup Final during the 1990–91 season at Central Park, Wigan on Saturday 29 September 1990.

Alan Tait played  in Widnes' 6-12 defeat by Wigan in the 1988–89 John Player Special Trophy Final during the 1988–89 season at Burnden Park, Bolton on Saturday 7 January 1989, and played , and scored a try in the 24-0 victory over Leeds in the 1991–92 Regal Trophy Final during the 1991–92 season at Central Park, Wigan on Saturday 11 January 1992.

In the 1992 World Cup Final at Wembley Stadium Tait was selected to play for Great Britain from the reserve bench in their defeat by Australia. He also made appearances in the Challenge Cup Finals in 1994 and 1995

Return to Union
With the advent of Rugby Union turning profession Tait along with many other converts switched codes back to union in 1996 signing for the Newcastle Falcons with whom he won the Premiership in 1998, making 19 appearances that season.

At first he was ignored by the Scotland selectors but eventually made his return for Scotland after a nine-year absence in 1997 and went on to represent the British & Irish Lions in South Africa also in the summer of that year. Surprising many Tait was selected to start the first two Tests on the wing, even though his favoured and more recognised position was at centre. This was due to coach Ian McGeechan believing that Tait would add extra defensive capabilities to the backline over the other wingers, in what would be a tight test series. He famously scored a try in the first match as the Lions won 25–16 in Cape Town. He also played in the second match which saw the Lions clinch the series after a dramatic 18–15 victory in Durban. Injured before the 3rd Test he did not play as the Lions lost the last match 35–16.

For Scotland Tait developed a devastating partnership with John Leslie. Many saw their pairing as instrumental in Scotland's good performances of the time and allowing stand-off Gregor Townsend to exploit gaps in the opposition defence. This was no more apparent that in the 1999 Five Nations Championship where Townsend would become the fifth and last player in history to score a try against each of the other countries in the five nations tournament. The championship culminated in Scotland narrowly finished ahead of England on points difference thanks to Wales' last minute victory over England at Wembley. Tait scored two tries in Scotland's last match of the tournament as they put in an historic performance to beat France 36–22. Later that year he represented Scotland for the last time at the 1999 World Cup finishing with a defeat by the All Blacks. He scored a try against South Africa in the pool stages at Murrayfield in a 46–29 reverse to the holders.  In 2000 Tait retired from professional rugby finishing his last game playing for his last club Edinburgh Reivers.

In all Tait played 27 times, scoring 17 tries, for Scotland, this is an exceptional record especially when considering that the bulk of these games were played after his return from League at the age of 32. Partly because of this it is why Tait is still regarded in high esteem by Scotland supporters to this day.

Coaching
Following his retirement from playing he then moved into coaching, initially working with Scotland as a defence coach. Although he was dismissed from the post by Matt Williams he was later restored to that role by Williams successor Frank Hadden. In 2004 he joined the Borders as a defensive coach.

Tait then moved back to the Falcons as an assistant before assuming the top job at the Premiership club as part of a restructuring process in the wake of Steve Bates' departure from the post of director of rugby in 2009. He held the position of Head Coach of Newcastle from 2009 to 2012 until club owner, Semore Kurdi announced Tait was 'taking a break from rugby' following a series of poor results.

On 7 July 2022 he was appointed the Defence Coach to the Southern Knights.

Family
Tait has a son, Michael, who was also a professional rugby union player. Michael appeared for the Scotland national under-20 rugby union team in 2010 and signed for Edinburgh in 2014 before retiring later the same year due to injury.

References

 Tait, Alan & Lothian, Bill Rugby Rebel: The Alan Tait Story'' (1998 Mainstream, Edinburgh)

External links
Profile & Statistics on ESPN Scrum
(archived by web.archive.org) Profile at leedsrugby
SCOTLAND RUGBY LEAGUE INTERNATIONAL HONOURS BOARD
When Widnes muscled in on Wigan's Rugby League trophy romp

1964 births
Living people
British & Irish Lions rugby union players from Scotland
Dual-code rugby internationals
Edinburgh Rugby players
Great Britain national rugby league team players
Kelso RFC players
Leeds Rhinos players
Newcastle Falcons players
Reds Trial players
Rugby league centres
Rugby league fullbacks
Rugby league players from Kelso
Rugby union centres
Rugby union players from Kelso
Scotland international rugby union players
Scotland national rugby league team captains
Scotland national rugby league team players
Scottish rugby league players
Scottish rugby union coaches
Scottish rugby union players
South of Scotland District (rugby union) players
Widnes Vikings players